Westringia cephalantha  is a shrub in the Lamiaceae family that is endemic to Western Australia.

Description
It is an erect, compact shrub growing from 10 cm to 150 cm high, on sandy and clayey soils or laterite. Its white flowers may be seen from July to December or January.

Distribution 
It is found in Beard's  Eremaean  and South-West Provinces.

Taxonomy
The species was formally described in 1868 by botanist Ferdinand von Mueller in Fragmenta Phytographiae Australiae, from a specimen collected by James Drummond. There are no synonyms.

References

cephalantha
Eudicots of Western Australia
Taxa named by Ferdinand von Mueller
Plants described in 1868
Lamiales of Australia